Sebastian Hoeneß (born 12 May 1982) is a German professional football coach and former player, who last managed Bundesliga club 1899 Hoffenheim. Hoeneß played as an attacking midfielder, who spent the majority of his career with Hertha BSC II.

Playing career
In his youth, Hoeneß played for TSV Ottobrunn, TSV Grötzingen and VfB Stuttgart. In his senior career, he played for Hertha BSC II and 1899 Hoffenheim. He ended his playing career in 2010.

Managerial career
Hoeneß began his managerial career with the Hertha Zehlendorf under-19 team from 2011 to 2013. He later coached the youth teams of RB Leipzig from 2014 to 2017. Between 2017 and 2019, he coached the Bayern Munich under-19 team, before replacing Holger Seitz in 2019 as manager of the club's reserve team, who were promoted in the previous season to the 3. Liga. In his first season, Hoeneß led the team to win their first 3. Liga title, and was awarded the league's manager of the season award. 

On 27 July 2020, Bundesliga club 1899 Hoffenheim announced Hoeneß as their new manager for the 2020–21 season, signing a three-year contract until 30 June 2023.

After turning out 9th in the 2021–22 season, Hoffenheim and Hoeneß parted ways.

Personal life
Sebastian Hoeneß is the son of former international Dieter Hoeneß, and the nephew of Uli Hoeneß, also a former international and the former president of Bayern Munich.

Managerial statistics

Honours

Manager

Club 
Bayern Munich II
3. Liga: 2019–20

Individual 
3. Liga Manager of the Season: 2020

References

External links

1982 births
Living people
Footballers from Munich
German footballers
Association football midfielders
Hertha BSC II players
TSG 1899 Hoffenheim players
TSG 1899 Hoffenheim II players
Regionalliga players
Oberliga (football) players
German football managers
FC Bayern Munich non-playing staff
FC Bayern Munich II managers
TSG 1899 Hoffenheim managers
3. Liga managers
Bundesliga managers